Anusha Siriratne is a Sri Lankan female aviator and served as one of the prominent pilots in the Sri Lankan Airlines. She is the first Sri Lankan female captain of the national carrier and also led the first all-female crew in the history of Sri Lankan Airlines. Her husband Hemantha Siriratne is also a pilot and the duo became the first husband-wife combination to work as captains at the Sri Lankan Airlines.

Education 
She completed her secondary education at the Holy Family Convent in Bambalapitiya.

Career 
She had a brief stint with the Sky Cabs as an instructor before joining the Sri Lankan Airlines as a full-time pilot. Anusha obtained her private pilot's license at CDE Aviation and received her commercial pilot's license in Texas. She became a cadet pilot in 1998 and served as a second officer on the Lockheed L1001 Tristar fleet. She was promoted to the position of first officer in 1991.

She was officially appointed as captain of Sri Lankan Airlines and became the first female to achieve the feat. She also led the first all-female crew on a flight from Colombo to Trichy on 1 November 2009.

See also 

 List of Sri Lankan aviators

References 

Living people
Sri Lankan aviators
Alumni of Holy Family Convent, Bambalapitiya
Year of birth missing (living people)